CJWC was a former radio station that operated on 329.5 metres (910 kilocycles) in Saskatoon, Saskatchewan, Canada from 1925-1929.

History
The station began broadcasting on September 28, 1925 and was owned by the Wheaton Electric Company. It aired with 50 watts.

Shortly after the first broadcast it was decided to increase the power to 250 watts in order to reach the farmers of the area. In 1928, the station was sold to Radio Service Limited, owned by J. H. Speers. Engineer Carl O'Brien moved to the new company to continue operating the station. Less than a year later, A. Murphy bought CJWC and shut it down.

External links

JWC
Jwc
Radio stations established in 1925
Radio stations disestablished in 1929
1925 establishments in Saskatchewan
1929 disestablishments in Canada
JWC (AM)